German submarine U-2546 was a Type XXI U-boat (one of the "Elektroboote") of Nazi Germany's Kriegsmarine, built for service in World War II. She was ordered on 6 November 1943, and was laid down on 22 November 1944 at the Blohm & Voss yard at Hamburg, as yard number 2546. She was launched on 19 February 1945, and commissioned under the command of Oberleutnant zur See  Max Dobbert on 21 March 1945.

Design
Like all Type XXI U-boats, U-2546 had a displacement of  when at the surface and  while submerged. The submarine was powered by two MAN SE supercharged six-cylinder M6V40/46KBB diesel engines each providing , two Siemens-Schuckert GU365/30 double-acting electric motors each providing , and two Siemens-Schuckert silent running GV232/28 electric motors each providing .

U-2546 was fitted with six  torpedo tubes in the bow and four  C/30 anti-aircraft guns. She could carry twenty-three torpedoes or seventeen torpedoes and twelve mines. The complement was five officers and fifty-two men.

Fate
U-2546 was scuttled on 3 May 1945, at Kiel  as part of Operation Regenbogen. The wreck was later raised and broken up.

References

Bibliography

External links
 

Type XXI submarines
U-boats commissioned in 1945
World War II submarines of Germany
1945 ships
Ships built in Hamburg
Operation Regenbogen (U-boat)
Maritime incidents in May 1945